The 1992–93 All-Ireland Senior Club Hurling Championship was the 23rd staging of the All-Ireland Senior Club Hurling Championship, the Gaelic Athletic Association's premier inter-county club hurling tournament. The championship ended on 17 March 1993.

Kiltormer were the defending champions but failed to qualify after being defeated in the county championship. Erin's Own of Cork, Ballyheigue of Kerry and Wolfe Tones of Longford made their first appearances in the championship.

On 17 March 1993, Sarsfields won the championship following a 1-17 to 2-7 defeat of Kilmallock in the All-Ireland final. This was their first All-Ireland title.

Paddy Kelly of Kilmallock was the championship's top scorer with 6-23.

Results

Connacht Senior Club Hurling Championship

First round

Quarter-final

Semi-final

Final

Leinster Senior Club Hurling Championship

First round

Quarter-finals

Semi-finals

Final

Munster Senior Club Hurling Championship

Quarter-finals

Semi-finals

Final

Ulster Senior Club Hurling Championship

Semi-finals

Final

All-Ireland Senior Club Hurling Championship

Quarter-final

Semi-finals

Final

Championship statistics

Top scorers

Top scorers overall

Top scorers in a single game

References

1992 in hurling
1993 in hurling
All-Ireland Senior Club Hurling Championship